Gorančo Koteski (born 18 August 1965 in Prilep) is a Macedonian military officer who holds the rank of major general and is the former Chief of General Staff of the Army of the Republic of Macedonia (2011―2015).

Biography 
Koteski was born in Prilep, a city in then Socialist Federative Republic of Yugoslavia, on 18 August 1965. Serving in the Yugoslav People's Army, he finished military school in Sarajevo and later attended a military academy in Belgrade. Following the formation of the Republic of Macedonia in 1991, Koteski served in the Army of the Republic of Macedonia and graduated from the NATO Defense College in Rome. He served as the military attache in Germany and as the commander of the Joint Operations Command (March―August 2015). In military circles, Koteski is considered a pro-NATO and pro-reform general.

On 16 August 2011, President Gjorge Ivanov signed a decree that appointed Koteski the new Chief of General Staff of the Army of the Republic of Macedonia, replacing Lieutenant General Miroslav Stojanovski. The decree also promoted him from Brigadier General to Major General. He formally took office two days later, on Army Day.

He was replaced as ARM Chief of General Staff by Metodija Velichkovski on 18 August 2015.

Personal life 
Koteski's brother is a member of the ruling VMRO-DPMNE political party. Koteski speaks German and English.

References 

People from Prilep
Yugoslav People's Army personnel
Army of North Macedonia personnel
1965 births
Living people